The Battle of Long Sault occurred over a five-day period in early May 1660 during the Beaver Wars. It was fought between French colonial militia, with their Huron and Algonquin allies, against the Iroquois Confederacy.

Some historians theorize that the Iroquois called off an intended attack on French settlements because one of their chiefs was killed in this battle, while others claim that the battle provided enough trophies to temper Iroquois aims.

Background
Adam Dollard des Ormeaux was a 24-year-old commander of the garrison at Ville-Marie (modern day Montreal). Dollard requested permission from Governor Paul Chomedey de Maisonneuve to lead an expedition up the Ottawa River to attack a war party of Iroquois. Many Iroquois warriors were encamped along the Ottawa and were preparing to destroy the settlements of Ville-Marie, Québec and Trois-Rivières. So in order to prevent this, Dollard would surprise and ambush the Iroquois before they could begin their campaign. Assembling a force of sixteen volunteer riflemen and four Algonquin warriors, including Chief Mituvemeg, the expedition left Montreal in late April with several canoes, filled with food, ammunition and weapons.

The journey through the waterways to the Long Sault rapids was slow, it reportedly took a week to get past the strong current just off of Montreal island and they had to pass through what is today known as the Lake of Two Mountains, and then the Ottawa. It was on or about May 1, when the expedition finally reached their destination. Deciding the area to be a good place for an ambush, the French and their allies occupied an old Algonquin fort along the Ottawa made up of trees planted in a circle and cut down to trunks. Forty Hurons, under their chief Etienne Annahotaha (fr), arrived at the fort not long after the French, they were happily greeted and joined the garrison for defence. Dollard ordered his men to reinforce the fortification by building a palisade around the wall of tree trunks but preparations were not entirely completed by the time the Iroquois arrived.

Battle
Over 200 Iroquois warriors were camped a few miles from Long Sault, they first made their appearance by advancing down the Ottawa in a fleet of canoes. Among the 200 were several Huron slaves who fought alongside their captors. Two canoes carrying five warriors were spotted by the French so Dollard decided to lay an ambush at a place where the Iroquois were most likely to land. Assuming correctly, Dollard's men drove off the enemy with musket fire and four of the Iroquois were killed or wounded. After this first skirmish, the fleet of canoes came in sight and began landing men. An immediate assault was made upon the fort but the Iroquois were repulsed, they then started preparing for a siege by building their own fort and siege works. But first they requested a parley. Suspecting it to be a ruse for a surprise attack, Dollard refused to consult with the Iroquois. In response the Iroquois attacked the French canoes. Undefended, the canoes were broken into pieces, set on fire and then used in a second assault to burn the walls of the French fort. Again the French and their warrior allies resisted and defeated the attacking Iroquois. Many natives were killed in the second attack, including the Seneca commander.

When the Seneca chief fell dead, a few Frenchmen fought their way out of the fort to the chief's body where they cut his head off and placed it on the palisade. After their chief was killed, the Iroquois launched a third attack but it was also repulsed and as result, a canoe was sent up the river to another war party of 500 men, who were on their way to sack Ville-Marie. Abandoning the advance towards Ville-Marie, the 500 warriors proceeded to Long Sault. When they arrived, it was the fifth day of fighting, the natives constructed mantelets (fr) made from three logs attached together to form a shield from musketry. Before the arrival of reinforcements, the Huron slaves shouted to the Hurons within the fort, assuring them that they would be treated well if they abandoned the French. All of the Hurons, except Chief Annahotaha, deserted at this point and joined the Iroquois and their Huron slaves. Deserting proved to be a mistake, all but five of the Hurons were killed, the remaining returned to Ville-Marie where they relayed the story of the defeat to the French colonists. When a fourth and final attack was launched, the Iroquois advanced with their mantelets ahead of them. The French and their allies could not hold out any longer, their corn dust food and muddy water was nearly exhausted. When within range, the French opened fire but the mantelets were capable of stopping the incoming musket balls.

With knives and axes the Iroquois hacked a breach through the fort's walls and started pouring in while others climbed on top of the structure for the attack. Standing atop one of the walls, Dollard ignited a keg of gunpowder which he intended to throw over the wall onto the Iroquois but when the bomb left his hands, it struck the palisade and exploded within the fort, killing or wounding many of the defenders. When the Iroquois were finally inside, Dollard and the others were quickly overpowered. Four Frenchmen were found alive: three of them were seriously wounded and burned alive within the fort, and the fourth was taken prisoner before being tortured and killed later on.

Archibald Lampman's epic poem "At the Long Sault" calls Dollard "Daulac".

Historiography
The deaths of Dollard des Ormeaux and his men were recounted by Catholic nuns and entered into official church history. For over a century, Dollard des Ormeaux became a heroic figure in New France, and then in Quebec, who exemplified selfless personal sacrifice, who had been martyrs for the church, and for the colony.  19th-century historians such as François-Xavier Garneau converted the battle into a religious and nationalistic epic in which zealous Roman Catholics deliberately sacrificed themselves to fend off an attack on New France.

However, there were other versions of the story, even then, that raised questions about Dollard's intentions and actions. For one, many historians now believe that Dollard and his men went up the Ottawa River for other reasons and did not even know of the approaching Iroquois. Nevertheless, Dollard did indeed divert the Iroquois army temporarily from its objective in 1660, thereby allowing the settlers to harvest their crop and escape famine.

Some historians have claimed that all Frenchmen including Dollard were killed in the last valiant explosion of the famous grenade that had not made it over the wall of the fort and landed in the midst of the remaining French. Others claim that some were captured and tortured to death, and in some extreme cases even cannibalized by the Iroquois. Also there are variations as to who relayed the fate of Dollard des Ormeaux, some versions claim it was Huron survivors who delivered the grim news to the French at Ville-Marie, others claim that Catholic nuns recounted the story.

Modern historians have looked beyond the politically charged elements surrounding Dollard des Ormeaux and come up with theories that differ from the traditionally told stories of his life and demise. For instance, some have hypothesized that Dollard's motivation for heading west from Ville Marie may not have been to head off the Iroquois war party. Instead, it was well known at the time that the Iroquois finished their hunting expeditions for furs in the spring, and an enterprising Frenchman with military experience, such as Dollard, may have been tempted to test his mettle by risking the voyage up the Ottawa River.

Some historians have also posited that the Iroquois did not continue to Montreal because it was not representative of Iroquois warfare tactics. Iroquois war parties sought the trophies of battle and taking prisoners. If Dollard des Ormeaux and his party did indeed stave off the Iroquois attack for seven days, their defeat would have satisfied that goal and aspect of Iroquoian warfare.

While skeptical of Dollard's "heroic martyrdom" narrative, historian Mark Bourrie accepts that "the big Iroquois army to the south of the Long Sault was close to Montreal and might have been heading for [it]," in which case the claims of 19th-century historians about the battle's military significance "may be true," and the battle may be thought of as "French Canada's Alamo."

See also
 French and Indian Wars

Notes

References
 
 
 

Long Sault
Long Sault
1660s in Canada
1660 in Canada
Long Sault
Long Sault
Long Sault
Long Sault
Events of National Historic Significance (Canada)